The Boston Pizza Cup is the Alberta provincial championship for men's curling, run by Curling Alberta. The winner represents Team Alberta at the national men's championship, called the Tim Hortons Brier.  Currently sponsored by restaurant chain Boston Pizza, under former sponsors, the championship was known as the Alberta Kia Cup and the Safeway Select. Prior to obtaining a title sponsor, the tournament was called the Alberta Tankard.

Qualification
In the current format, twelve teams compete in the provincial tournament.  The following teams qualify:

The defending champion(s) automatically qualify(ies) – either or both the previous year's Boston Pizza Cup winner and/or an Albertan-based "Team Canada" that failed to defend a Brier title the previous year can be entered as a "defending champion." If for whatever reason no defending champion enters the tournament (for example, because they qualified automatically for the Brier as the defending national champion) then an additional Alberta Tour team qualifies as described below;
The top Albertan team as determined by the Canadian Team Ranking System qualifies – if this team is entered as the defending provincial champion and/or is the defending national champion (or otherwise does not participate) then the next ranked team qualifies, if that team is also qualified (or does not enter) then the next ranked team qualifies, and so on;
The team(s) with the most Alberta Tour points not already qualified also qualify(ies) – the number of teams that qualify by this method can be one, two or three depending on how many "defending champions" enter;
The remaining eight spots are determined through the "traditional" route, that is, through zone and district playdowns. As of 2020, four teams qualify from the Southern Zone, three from the Northern Zone and one from Peace River Country.

Past champions
Listed below are the provincial champion skips for each year. Alberta did not participate in the 1927 Brier.

Starting in 2015, teams that win the previous year's Brier have been automatically entered into the national championship as "Team Canada." Any such Albertan-based teams do not participate in that year's provincial championship. Such teams have the right to enter as a "defending champion" in the year following any failed defence of their Brier title, although as of 2020 both teams eligible to qualify in this way so far have declined to enter - Simmons' team disbanded after failing to win the 2016 Brier, while Koe qualified for the Olympics after failing to win the 2017 Brier.

Also, starting in 2018, the top two CTRS teams not otherwise qualified play a "Wild Card Game" for an additional main draw Brier entry.

Notes
  Koe assembled a new team following his 2014 Brier win, and won the 2015 Boston Pizza Cup after re-qualifying with his new team. His former team, skipped by Pat Simmons, competed in the 2015 and 2016 Briers as Team Canada.
  Qualified for the Brier as Team Canada.
  Qualified for the Brier as Wild Card.
  Due to World War II, the Brier was not held from 1943 through 1945.
  Since there was neither a Team Canada nor a Wild Card in the 2014 or prior Briers it was not possible for more than one Albertan team to play in those tournaments, therefore this column is left blank for 2014 and all prior years.

References

External link
Past winners

The Brier provincial tournaments
Curling in Alberta